The Little Two River is a  tributary of the Mississippi River in Morrison County, Minnesota, United States.

See also
List of rivers of Minnesota

References

Minnesota Watersheds
USGS Hydrologic Unit Map - State of Minnesota (1974)

Rivers of Minnesota
Tributaries of the Mississippi River
Rivers of Morrison County, Minnesota